is a Japanese football player. She plays for Tokyo Verdy Beleza and Japan national team. Her brother Seigo Kobayashi is also footballer.

Club career
Kobayashi was born in Hyogo Prefecture on July 21, 1997. After graduating from high school, she joined L.League club Nippon TV Beleza in 2016. However she could not play in first 2 seasons due to injury. She debuted in 2018 season.

National team career
In 2013, Kobayashi was selected Japan U-16 national team for 2013 AFC U-16 Championship. She scored 7 goals and became a top scorer. Japan team also won the championship. In 2014, Kobayashi was selected Japan U-17 national team for 2014 U-17 World Cup. She played at 5 matches and scored 2 goals, and Japan won the championship.

In 2015, Kobayashi was selected Japan U-19 national team for 2015 AFC U-19 Championship. Japan won the championship and she was selected Best players award. Although Japan qualified for the 2016 U-20 World Cup, she was not selected Japan team for the tournament due to injury.

In February 2019, Kobayashi was selected Japan national team for SheBelieves Cup. At this tournament, on February 27, she debuted against United States.

National team statistics

International goals
.''Scores and results list Japan's goal tally first.

References

External links

Japan Football Association

1997 births
Living people
Hosei University alumni
Association football people from Hyōgo Prefecture
Japanese women's footballers
Japan women's international footballers
Nadeshiko League players
Nippon TV Tokyo Verdy Beleza players
Women's association football forwards
2019 FIFA Women's World Cup players